Nashikrao Tirpude (16 January 1921 - 19 May 2002) was an Indian politician and first Deputy Chief Minister of the state of Maharashtra.

He belonged to Congress Party. When Indira Gandhi caused a split in the party in January 1978, he gave her support. After Congress (Indira) did well in the next month's assembly election and jointly formed the government with Congress (main faction), he became Deputy CM in the new coalition.

He was born on 16 January 1921 in Ganeshpur. He was a Dalit and Ambedkarite Buddhist.

In 1986, he raised a demand for a separate state of Vidharbh and started Vidarbha movement. In 1995, he had a key role in the formation of All India Indira Congress (Now Dissolved). He was a member of working committee central parliamentary board and President of Maharashtra Pradesh Indira congress Party.

He died on 19 May 2002.

References

Deputy Chief Ministers of Maharashtra
Maharashtra MLAs 1967–1972
2002 deaths
1921 births
Indian National Congress politicians
Indian Buddhists
Indian National Congress (U) politicians
All India Indira Congress (Tiwari) politicians
Indian National Congress politicians from Maharashtra